The State is an American comedy troupe. The troupe was founded by a group of New York University students in 1988, as an offshoot of the NYU improv comedy group The Sterile Yak; it was briefly named The New Group before landing on the name The State. The troupe's members are Kevin Allison, Michael Ian Black, Robert Ben Garant, Todd Holoubek, Michael Patrick Jann, Kerri Kenney-Silver, Thomas Lennon, Joe Lo Truglio, Ken Marino, Michael Showalter and David Wain. As a group, the troupe is best known for creating and starring in the 1993-1995 MTV sketch comedy series The State. However, since the show aired, members of the troupe have frequently collaborated on other television and film projects, including Viva Variety, Reno 911!, and the Wet Hot American Summer media franchise. The comedy group Stella is composed of three of The State's members, Showalter, Black and Wain, and starred in the 2005 sketch comedy series Stella, among other works. Additionally, some members of The State have achieved independent success as comic actors, writers and directors.

Other works as a troupe
In 1996, the members of The State recorded an album, Comedy for Gracious Living, at Compass Point Studios for Warner Bros. It was shelved for unknown reasons. After being unearthed from the Warner vault, it was finally released in September 2010 by Rhino/Handmade via rhino.com. The 25-track release features cuts such as "Skip This Track (They Were Drunk)" and "Kerri's one Second Noise." With liner notes written by the troupe, the packaging is notable for having, perhaps, the longest printed booklet ever included in a CD package.

A book the group wrote, State By State with The State: An Uninformed, Poorly Researched Guide To Traveling In The United States, was published in April 1997. It is currently out of print.

The entire group appeared in the 2007 film The Ten, directed by David Wain, in some cases in cameo appearances. On March 15, 2008, most of the troupe reunited for a special reunion sketch show at Upright Citizens Brigade Theatre in Los Angeles.

In 2008, the group attempted to reunite to make "a movie about American history" for Comedy Central, with the working title This American Sandwich. However, the attempt was derailed by the 2007–2008 Writers Guild of America strike.

Other collaborative works 

In addition, the following works involve two or more The State members:
 I Love the 70s, I Love the 80s & I Love the 90s - feature commentary from many State members, including Michael Ian Black, Michael Showalter and David Wain
 The Baxter (2005) - written and directed by Showalter, featuring Showalter, Wain, Black, Lo Truglio and Marino.
 Diggers (2006) - written by Marino (who appears in a supporting role), co-produced by Wain.
 Reaper (2007-2009) - features Black and Marino in supporting roles; one episode was directed by Jann.
 I Love You, Man (2009) - features Lennon and Lo Truglio in supporting roles.
 Wanderlust (2011) - directed by Wain, written and produced by Wain and Marino, and featuring roles by Marino, Kenney-Silver, Lo Truglio, Black, Showalter, and Wain.
 Brooklyn Nine-Nine (2013-2021) - featured Lo Truglio as a main cast member, and featured Marino in a several-episode guest arc.
 Wet Hot American Summer: Ten Years Later (2017) - directed by Wain, written by Wain and Showalter among others, and featuring Black, Lo Truglio, Marino, Showalter and Wain.
 A Futile and Stupid Gesture (2018) - directed by Wain, and featuring Lennon, Lo Truglio, Kenney-Silver and Wain.
 Garant and Lennon are frequent screenwriting partners, having collaborated on the Night at the Museum trilogy, Balls of Fury, The Pacifier, Let's Go to Prison (also with Michael Patrick Jann), Taxi (2004) and Herbie: Fully Loaded.

References

American comedy troupes